Trigonocera is a genus of flies in the family Dolichopodidae. It is known from the Afrotropical, Oriental and Palaearctic realms.

Species
Trigonocera ethiopiensis Grichanov, 2013
Trigonocera guizhouensis Wang, Yang & Grootaert, 2008
Trigonocera lucidiventris Becker, 1922
Trigonocera madagascarensis Grichanov, 2013
Trigonocera munroi (Curran, 1926)
Trigonocera obscura De Meijere, 1916
Trigonocera rivosa Becker, 1902 (Synonym: T. africana Naglis, 1999)
Trigonocera shuensis Liu & Yang in Liu, Wang, Tang & Yang, 2018
Trigonocera specialis Becker, 1922
Trigonocera tongshiensis (Yang, 2002)

T. biseta Olejnicek, 2004 has been moved to Chrysotus.

References

Dolichopodidae genera
Diaphorinae
Diptera of Africa
Diptera of Asia
Taxa named by Theodor Becker